Anton Ghering (died 1668) was a Flemish Baroque painter who specialized in architectural church interiors. He is best known for his interior of the Antwerp church of St. Walburgis (Royal Museum of Fine Arts, Antwerp) which records the original placement along with the frame and predella paintings of Peter Paul Rubens's Raising of the Cross.

Sources 

 Hans Jantzen, Das Niederländische Architekturbild, Braunschweig, Klinkhardt & Biermann, 1910
 Bernard G. Maillet, La Peinture Architecturale des Ecoles du Nord : les Intérieurs d'Eglises 1580-1720, Pandora Publishers Wijnegem, 2012, 

1668 deaths
Flemish Baroque painters
Year of birth unknown